The white-blue-white flag is a symbol of opposition to the 2022 Russian invasion of Ukraine that has been used by Russian anti-war protesters. It has also been used as a symbol of opposition to the current government of Vladimir Putin, by several personal internet accounts.

Creation and symbolism
Several people created the idea of the white-blue-white flag shortly after the 2022 Russian invasion of Ukraine started on 24 February 2022. Kai Katonina, a Berlin-based user experience designer, and a Russia-based art manager with the pseudonym "Fish Sounds", also known as "", are each credited with having created the flag. It was first used on social media on 28 February 2022, and has been flown by Russian expatriates at various anti-war protests.

One of the stated reasons for replacing the red stripe of the flag of Russia by a white one is to remove the association with "blood and violence". , one of the creators of the flag, stated: "The red on the modern Russian flag is associated not just with blood, but with its military power and authoritarian strength. So, this is not just the removal of blood, but, most importantly, the removal of the cult of militarism and violence. WBR is a historical authoritarian flag introduced by Tsarist Russia. It's also associated with militarism, with Russian imperial cores."

Despite the reasoning behind replacing the red stripe by a white one, not all anti-war activists and opposition parties have used the flag. Several opposition activists (such as Maria Motuznaya) have criticized AssezJeune's reasons for removing the red stripe.

Usage and reactions

Use of the flag began shortly after the start of the invasion, and the flag began to garner wide appeal among protesters who oppose the war. The white-blue-white flag has an official website, where it is described as the "Flag of the Wonderful Russia of the Future" and "A symbol of freedom and peace"; the website includes background information in multiple languages. The flag has not been associated with representing a single organization exclusively, and several anti-war organisations have demonstrated support for it as a broader symbol of anti-war sentiment and unity. The similarity and analogy with the white-red-white flag that has been widely used during the 2020–2021 Belarusian protests is often listed as one of its advantages, as is the similarity to the flag of Veliky Novgorod, in which the government of the Novgorod Republic had a reputation for developing democratic governance.

The white-blue-white flag has been used at anti-war protests in Tbilisi, Georgia, Berlin, Germany, Sofia, Bulgaria, Bern, Switzerland, Limassol, Cyprus, Prague, Czech Republic, The Hague, Netherlands, and Riga, Latvia. In addition, some media have reported that the flag has also been used by protesters in Yekaterinburg, Russia, although this claim has not been supported by any evidence.

On 31 March 2022, the head of the Duma commission on foreign interference, Vasily Piskarev, appealed to the Prosecutor General's Office to ban the white-blue-white Russian flag as extremist, since "this symbolism is used in protests against the military operation in Ukraine not only in Russia, but also in other countries".

Members of the Freedom of Russia Legion, composed of Russians who defected from the Russian Armed Forces to Ukraine, have been seen wearing patches of the flag on their military uniforms.

The white-blue-white flag (as well as other symbols of Russia) was banned during the Equality Parade in Warsaw, held alongside KyivPride. KyivPride published a statement about possible provocations, labeling any intentions to "display Russian flags of any color" a provocation and an unacceptable step meant to advance the Russian agenda.

On 21 August 2022, the manifesto of a hitherto unknown partisan group within Russia, National Republican Army (NRA) endorsed the adoption of the white-blue-white flag. The manifesto was issued following the car bomb assassination of Darya Dugina and read aloud by exiled Russian politician Ilya Ponomarev on his video outlet "February Morning" and published via its affiliated Telegram-based news service "Rospartisan". The white-blue-white flag motif is employed by February Morning on air and in its social media profiles.

In culture
On 16 September 2022, rapper Oxxxymiron released an anti-war video for the song "Oyda", which refers to the white-blue-white flag: "Our flag has white snow and a blue river (and that's it!)"

Gallery

See also

Pacifist topics
 Peace flag
 Green ribbon (Russia) – used by protesters against the Russian invasion of Ukraine
 White-red-white flag – similar flag used by the Belarusian opposition
 2022 anti-war protests in Russia

Militarist topics
 Z (military symbol) – used by supporters of the Russian invasion of Ukraine
 Ribbon of Saint George

References

Further reading 
 
  [3:40]
 
 
 
  [12:34]

External links 
 ; in Russian: 
 ; in Russian: 

Reactions to the 2022 Russian invasion of Ukraine
Flags of Russia
Articles with unsourced statements from March 2022
Opposition to Vladimir Putin
Protests in Russia
Flags introduced in 2022
2022 establishments in Russia
Activism flags